The Kimberley Marine Park, formerly known as the Kimberley Commonwealth Marine Reserve and also known as the Great Kimberley Marine Park,  is an Australian marine park offshore of Western Australia, near the Kimberley region. It is one of the 13 parks managed under the North-west Marine Parks Network. It covers a number of state-managed marine parks.

Conservation values

Species and habitat
Important foraging areas for migratory seabirds, migratory dugongs, dolphins and threatened and migratory marine turtles.
Important migration pathway and nursery areas for the protected humpback whale.
Adjacent to important foraging and pupping areas for sawfish and important nesting sites for green turtles.
The reserve provides protection for the communities and habitats of waters offshore of the Kimberley coastline ranging in depth from less than 15 metres to 800 metres.

Bioregions and ecology
Continental shelf, slope, plateau, pinnacle, terrace, banks and shoals and deep hole/valley seafloor features are all represented in this reserve
Examples of the communities and seafloor habitats of the Northwest Shelf Transition, Northwest Shelf Province and Timor Province provincial bioregions along with the Kimberley, Canning, Northwest Shelf and Oceanic Shoals meso-scale bioregions.
Ancient coastline (an area of enhanced productivity attracting baitfish which, in turn, supplies food for migrating species).
Continental slope demersal fish communities (the second richest area for demersal fish species in Australia).

History
The marine park was proclaimed under the EPBC Act on 14 December 2013 as the Kimberley Commonwealth Marine Reserve and renamed Kimberley Marine Park on 9 October 2017. The management plan and protection measures of the marine park came into effect for the first time on 1 July 2018.

Summary of protection zones
The Kimberley Marine Park has been assigned IUCN protected area category VI. However, within the marine park there are three protection zones, each zone has an IUCN category and related rules for managing activities to ensure the protection of marine habitats and species.

The following table is a summary of the zoning rules within the Kimberley Marine Park:

State-based marine parks
The Government of Western Australia's  Department of Biodiversity, Conservation and Attractions has been collaborating with the traditional owners of the respective areas in overseeing the planning, development and consolidation of a number of marine parks within the region,: in the first ever marine parks co-designed with traditional owners and the state government.

These comprise:
 Bardi Jawi Marine Park (proposed), in Bardi Jawi country.
 Lalang-gaddam Marine Park (in planning stages; formerly Great Kimberley Marine Park), which will cover Dambimangari waters:
Lalang-garram / Camden Sound Marine Park
Lalang-garram / Horizontal Falls Marine Park
North Lalang-garram Marine Park
Maiyalam Marine Park (gazetted 2020/21), covering the Buccaneer Archipelago 
North Kimberley Marine Park (2016), in Uunguu waters.

The proposed draft plan for the  Bardi Jawi, Mayala and Maiyalam marine parks was put up for public consultation in late 2020. Under the plan, covering , recreational fishing would be banned or restricted in 40 per cent of the area, which ignited debate about fishing rights. In November 2021 a revised plan was issued, after 17,000 submissions had been received. The new plan allowed greater access for recreational fishers, in particular addressing the concerns of local fishers. The final plan is  expected to be released in early 2022.

See also

List of marine parks in Australia (incomplete)
 Protected areas managed by the Australian government

References

External links
 North-west Marine Parks Network - Parks Australia
 North-west Marine Parks Network - environment.gov.au (outdated)

Australian marine parks